The 77th District of the Iowa House of Representatives in the state of Iowa.

Current elected officials
Amy Nielsen is the representative currently representing the district.

Past representatives
The district has previously been represented by:
 Daniel L. Bray, 1971–1973
 Jay Mennenga, 1973–1977
 John Pelton, 1977–1983
 Mark A. Haverland, 1983–1993
 Wayne H. McKinney, 1993–1995
 David G. Lord, 1995–2001
 Jodi Tymeson, 2001–2003
 Mary Mascher, 2003–2013
 Sally Stutsman, 2013–2017
 Amy Nielsen, 2017–present

References

077